The Australian Shark-Incident Database has recorded that between 1791 and April 2018 there were 1068 shark attacks in Australia with 237 of them being fatal.

Four species of sharks account for the vast majority of fatal attacks on humans: the bull shark, tiger shark, oceanic whitetip shark and the great white shark.

In 2021 Australian authorities pushed to rebrand shark attacks as “negative encounters” or “interactions” to boost conservation efforts and alter perceptions of sharks as vicious.

Shark netting

Since shark netting began in 1937, the number of deaths from sharks on beaches has been reduced in New South Wales, with only one fatal attack on a netted beach during that time. In Queensland there has not been a fatal attack on a netted beach since nets were introduced in the 1960s.

Precautions against attacks
The Australian Department of the Environment, Water, Heritage and the Arts states precautions which can be taken to reduce the risk of shark attacks. These include avoiding swimming far from the shore, at the mouth of a river or on drop-offs to deeper water; avoiding swimming in dirty water, alone or with domestic animals, near people fishing, or at dusk or night; and to leave the water if schools of fish behave erratically or group in large numbers. The Australian Institute of Marine Science also states many of these and other precautions including not wearing jewelry or reflective clothing while swimming, and not swimming with any bleeding wounds.

Non-fatal attacks

Fatal attacks

See also
Shark attacks in South Australia
List of fatal shark-incidents in Australia

References

Shark Bait-Shark Bite, The Courier-Mail 16 Dec 1933

External links
Shark research institute Australia stats

 
Animal attacks in Australia
Sharks